The Cyclopidae are a family of copepods containing more than half of the 1,200 species in the order Cyclopoida in over 70 genera.

Genera
These genera are accepted as valid:

Abdiacyclops Karanovic, 2005
Acanthocyclops Kiefer, 1927
Afrocyclops G. O. Sars, 1927
Allocyclops Kiefer, 1932
Ancheuryte Herbst, 1989
Anzcyclops Karanovic, Eberhard & Murdoch, 2011
Apocyclops Lindberg, 1942
Australocyclops Morton, 1985
Australoeucyclops Karanovic
Austriocyclops Kiefer, 1964
Bacillocyclops Lindberg, 1956
Bryocyclops Kiefer, 1927
Caspicyclops Monchenko, 1986
Cochlacocyclops Kiefer, 1955
Colpocyclops Monchenko, 1977
Cyclops Müller, 1785
Diacyclops Kiefer, 1927
Dussartcyclops Karanovic, Eberhard & Murdoch, 2011
Ectocyclops Brady, 1904
Eucyclops Claus, 1893
Euryte Philippi, 1843
Faurea Labbé, 1927
Fierscyclops Karanovic, 2004
Fimbricyclops Reid, 1993
Goniocyclops Kiefer, 1955
Graeteriella Brehm, 1926
Halicyclops Norman, 1903
Haplocyclops Kiefer, 1952
Hesperocyclops Herbst, 1984
Heterocyclops Claus, 1893
Idiocyclops Herbst, 1987
Itocyclops Reid & Ishida, 2000
Kieferiella Lescher-Moutoue, 1976
Macrocyclops Claus, 1893
Megacyclops Kiefer, 1927
Menzeliella Lindberg, 1954
Meridiecyclops Fiers, 2001
Mesocyclops G. O. Sars, 1914
Metacyclops Kiefer, 1927
Microcyclops Claus, 1893
Mixocyclops Kiefer, 1944
Muscocyclops Kiefer, 1937
Neocyclops Gurney, 1927
Neutrocyclops Kiefer, 1936
Ochridacyclops Kiefer, 1937
Orbuscyclops Karanovic, 2006
Orthocyclops Forbes, 1897
Palaeocyclops Monchenko, 1972
Paracyclops Claus, 1893
Paragraeteriella Rylov, 1948
Pareuryte Herbst, 1952
Pescecyclops Karanovic, Eberhard & Murdoch, 2011
Pilbaracyclops Karanovic, Eberhard & Murdoch, 2011
Ponticyclops Reid, 1987
Prehendocyclops C. E. F. Rocha, Iliffe, Reid & Suarez-Morales, 2000
Protocyclops Lindberg, 1952
Psammocyclops Kiefer, 1955
Psammophilocyclops Fryer, 1956
Reidcyclops Karanovich, 2000
Rheocyclops Reid, Strayer, McArthur, Stibbe & J. Lewis, 1999
Rybocyclops Reddy & DeFaye, 2008
Smirnoviella Monchenko, 1977
Speocyclops Kiefer, 1937
Stolonicyclops Reid, 1998
Teratocyclops Plesa, 1981
Thaumasiocyclops Kiefer, 1933
Thermocyclops Kiefer, 1927
Troglocyclops C. E. F. Rocha & Iliffe, 1994
Tropocyclops Kiefer, 1927
Yansacyclops Reid, 1988
Zealandcyclops Karanovic, 2005

References

 
Crustacean families
Taxa named by Constantine Samuel Rafinesque
Copepods